The Grammy Award for Best Historical Album has been presented since 1979 and recognizes achievements in audio restoration. Since this category's creation, the award had several minor name changes:

In 1979 the award was known as Best Historical Repackage Album
In 1980 it was awarded as Best Historical Reissue
In 1981 it was awarded as Best Historical Reissue Album
From 1982 to the present it has been awarded as Best Historical Album

Years reflect the year in which the Grammy Awards were presented, for works released in the previous year. The award is presented to individuals responsible for compiling and engineering the winning album. The roles of these individuals have changed over time:

From 1979 to 1993 the award was given to the Producer(s) 
From 1994 to 1995 it was awarded to the Compilation Producer(s)
In 1996 it was awarded to the Art Director, Compilation Producer, Mastering Engineers, and/or Album Notes Writers
From 1997 to 2018 it was awarded to the Compilation Producer(s) and/or Mastering Engineer(s)
Since 2019 it has been awarded to the Compilation Producer(s), Mastering Engineer(s) and/or Restoration Engineer(s).

The award does not go to the artists, unless an artist is also a compilation producer and/or mastering engineer.

Winners and nominees

Notes

References

 
Historical